Keeley Davis (born 5 July 2000) is an Australian rugby league footballer who plays for the St George Illawarra Dragons in the NRL Women's Premiership and the Cronulla-Sutherland Sharks in the NSWRL Women's Premiership. 

Background
Davis was born in Wollongong and played her junior rugby league for the Corrimal Cougars before joining the Illawarra Steelers in the Tarsha Gale Cup.

Playing career

2018
In June, Davis represented NSW Country at the Women's National Championships. On 26 July, she signed with the St George Illawarra Dragons for the inaugural NRL Women's Premiership season.

In Round 1 of the 2018 NRL Women's season, she made her debut for the Dragons as an 18-year old in their 4–30 loss to the Brisbane Broncos. 

On 6 October, she represented the Prime Minister's XIII in their win over Papua New Guinea. On 13 October, she made her Test debut for Australia in their 26–24 win over New Zealand.

2019
In May, she again represented NSW Country at the Women's National Championships. On 6 October, she started at five-eighth in the Dragons' Grand Final loss to the Brisbane Broncos. Later that month, she represented Australia at the 2019 Rugby League World Cup 9s and in a 28–8 win over New Zealand.

2020
In February, she was a member of the Dragons' 2020 NRL Nines-winning team. At the Dragons' end of season awards, she won the club's Coach's Award.

2021
Keeley was a member of the Dragons team that finished in 2nd place during the season and lost 16-4 to the Sydney Roosters in the grand final at Leichhardt Oval on 10 April 2022.

2022
Keeley is a member of the Dragons team in the 2022 NRLW season.

Achievements and accolades

Individual
St George Illawarra Dragons Coach's Award: 2020

Captained St George Illawarra Dragons NRLW in 2021, current vice captain of the team

References

External links
St George Illawarra Dragons profile

2000 births
Living people
Australian female rugby league players
Australia women's national rugby league team players
Rugby league hookers
Rugby league five-eighths
St. George Illawarra Dragons (NRLW) players